Jérémie Carboni (born 28 December 1980) is a French film producer, director, advisor and entrepreneur.

Family and education
From his paternal grandmother's side, he is the descendant of the aristocratic and upper-class Michau family, from Orléans including senior political and business figures (senior military officers, a deputy mayor of Orléans and industrialists).

He is also a cousin of Bruno Rozenker, actor and voice actor and a relative of Pierre-Bloch family. Cousin of the TV producer and politician David Pierre-Bloch, who is the son of Claude Pierre-Bloch (press attaché of Michel Sardou) and the nephew of Jean-Pierre Pierre-Bloch (impresario and deputy mayor of Paris); both brothers are the sons of French minister Jean Pierre-Bloch and were also Johnny Hallyday's friends.

Grandson of Michel Carboni (1916-1977), a French senior official, Customs' Director of Nice and on his mother's side of Jacques Rozenker (1932–2014), entrepreneur in the textile field, designer, who has worked with the singer Sylvie Vartan and has launched French stylists Marithé + François Girbaud.

Carboni is the son of Jean-Michel Carboni (former diplomat, senior executive of Gaz de France and deputy CEO of Engie) and Régine Rozenker (a classical pianist). The family lived in Norway, France, Greece, Hungary and also in Italy (for 6 years) where he attended the Lycée français Chateaubriand in Rome. Then he studied at the Accademia di Belle Arti di Roma and at the Rome University of Fine Arts before graduating in filmmaking in Paris. He also studied briefly Political science.

Film and Theatre career
Carboni began as a production assistant, assistant director and head of development for Stéphane Tchalgadjieff and Danièle Gégauff (Solaris S.A.), producers of film directors Michelangelo Antonioni, Jacques Rivette, Benoît Jacquot, Robert Bresson, Marguerite Duras, Wim Wenders, Wong Kar Wai, Steven Soderbergh, etc.

His first film is the documentary Bartleby en coulisses, on the theatrical work of famous writer Daniel Pennac, for the reading-performance of Bartleby, the Scrivener (short story of Herman Melville) at the Théâtre de la Pépinière in Paris (2009).

In 2013, Carboni founded and became president of Compagnie MIA (Mouvement International Artistique), a theatre company created for French writer Daniel Pennac to produce his shows (Journal d’un corps, L’œil, du loup, Un Amour exemplaire...). In the same year, he directed his second movie, a history of electronic music with composers Jean Michel Jarre, Émilie Simon, Teho Teardo, Moriarty (band), François Bayle, etc. The film has been selected and screened in Paris on 19 June 2013, by MusiquePointDoc film festival of La Gaîté Lyrique.

In 2017, his third film is a portrait of French stylists Marithé et François Girbaud, inventors of skin-tight jeans, baggy trousers and the industrialization of Stone washing process.

In 2022, he directed a tribute film on French writer Michel Déon, member of the Académie française and of literary movement named Les Hussards, born in the 1950s. Michel Déon, Jean d'Ormesson, Milan Kundera, Emmanuel Carrère, Xavier Darcos, Yves Boisset, Eric Neuhoff, Antoine Gallimard took part in this film.

Filmography
Cinema & TV
2005 : Réunion de famille (short film)
2009 : La Sombra del Tiempo (short film) (coproducer)
2010 : Bartleby en coulisses
2013 : Point d'Orgue (coproducer)
2013 : Musique(s) électronique(s)
2017 : Marithé + François = Girbaud
2021 : Michel Déon ou la force de l'amitié

Music videos
2010 : Notre Terre performed by Cynthia Brown (singer) (Mercury – Universal)
2011 : La Place du passager performed by Dominique Fidanza (Mercury – Universal) 
2016 : Long is the Night performed by Moriarty (Air Rytmo – Shot in 360° virtual reality at the Louvre museum)

Theatre video capture
2010 : Bartleby le scribe with Daniel Pennac (Théâtre de la Pépinière)

Theatre career (Compagnie MIA)
In 2013, under the impetus of French writer Daniel Pennac, Carboni founded (with Laurent Natrella of the Comédie-française) and became Chairman of the Compagnie MIA. He left his manager position in 2019.

2012–15 : Journal d'un corps written by and performed by Daniel Pennac (Théâtre des Bouffes du Nord)
2014–15 : L'Oeil du loup (Eye Of the Wolf written by Daniel Pennac) with Malian actor Habib Dembélé (Maison des Métallos, Paris)
2015 : Manèges written by Laura Alcoba
2017–19 : Un Amour exemplaire with Daniel Pennac (Teatro Bellini, Naples)
2019–? : Le Cas Malaussène by Daniel Pennac

Political and Business advisor
 Carboni also worked occasionally in politics as a communication and audiovisual advisor for République solidaire party founded by former Prime minister Dominique de Villepin, for centrist political parties or for Maliyéanbêdétayé, the Malian political mouvement of Habib Dembélé.
 In 2018, Carboni co-founded and became CEO of a consulting firm specialized in renewable energy.

References

External links 
 

Living people
1980 births
People from Châtenay-Malabry